The first electoral unit of the Federation of Bosnia and Herzegovina is a parliamentary constituency used to elect members to the House of Representatives of the Federation of Bosnia and Herzegovina since 2000.  It consists of Una-Sana Canton.

Demographics

Representatives

References

Constituencies of Bosnia and Herzegovina